Raadio Uuno was an Estonian radio station.
The station began operating in 1994, becoming the first music channel in Estonia.  Radio Uuno is owned by the largest radio group in Estonia AS TRIO LSL. They have Eesti Top 40, official charts of Estonia which later turned into "Eesti Top 20"

On October 1, 2016, the station was renamed 'MyHits'.

External links
  
 Eesti Top 40 Airplay chart

Uuno
Mass media in Tallinn
Radio stations established in 1994
Radio stations disestablished in 2016
Defunct radio stations
Defunct mass media in Estonia